Goloborodko or Holoborodko (Cyrillic: Голобородько) is a gender-neutral Ukrainian surname. Notable people with the surname include:

 Aleksandr Goloborodko (born 1938), Ukrainian-born Russian actor
 Alexey Goloborodko (born 1994), Russian contortionist
 Vasily Petrovych Goloborodko, fictional character in the Ukrainian TV series Servant of the People
 Vasyl Holoborodko (born 1945), Ukrainian poet

See also
 

Ukrainian-language surnames